Arhippa Perttunen (Ladvozero village, now a part of the Republic of Karelia 1769 – c. 1841) was a Karelian folk singer.

Around 1834, Elias Lönnrot met Perttunen for three days, while on his fifth field trip collecting poems for his Kalevala. Perttunen would have sung in the Karelian dialect, so it was necessary for  Lönnrot to make some modifications to make the poems more understandable to Finnish readers. Later, two other collectors, Johan Fredrik Cajan (in 1836) and Matthias Alexander Castrén (in 1839), visited Perttunen, and in total 85 texts of Perttunen's poetry were collected. Perttunen would have performed the poems orally. Stylistically, his text contains widespread use of alliteration and parallelism, similarly to other singers featured in the Kalevala. His tradition was also carried on by his son Miihkali, who collected 81 of his poems.

The State Prize of the Karelian ASSR was named after him.

Literature

References 

1769 births
1841 deaths
People from the Republic of Karelia
People from Archangelgorod Governorate
Finnish folk singers
Karelian-Finnish folklore